The Norwegian Association of Senior Hospital Physicians is a Norwegian medical association and trade union. It is one of the largest associations within the Norwegian Medical Association and mainly organises consultants at hospitals. It is thus a parallel to the Norwegian Junior Doctors Association which mainly organises residents. The Norwegian Association of Senior Hospital Physicians was founded on 15 February 1961 and its first president was Johan Haffner, who later also became president of the Norwegian Medical Association. It publishes the magazine Overlegen ("The Consultant").

References

External links
 

Trade unions in Norway
Organizations established in 1961
Organisations based in Oslo
1961 establishments in Norway
Medical associations based in Norway